Bjørnøy Lighthouse is a coastal lighthouse in Bodø Municipality in Nordland county, Norway. It is located on the small island of Bjørnøya, just east of the larger Landegode island.

It has a white, red, or green light (depending on direction) that is occulting twice every 7.5 seconds. The lighthouse is painted white and the lantern roof is red.

History
The original lighthouse building was constructed in 1890.  The light was mounted on a stone base and attached to the seaward end of a -story keeper's house.  The house was white and the light portion was red.  That light was in use from 1890 until 1972 when it was replaced by a new, automated, concrete tower.  The old building sits just a short distance from the new light.

See also

Lighthouses in Norway
List of lighthouses in Norway

References

External links
 Norsk Fyrhistorisk Forening 
 Picture of Bjørnøy Lighthouse

Lighthouses completed in 1890
Lighthouses in Nordland
Buildings and structures in Bodø
1890 establishments in Norway